Parlux is an Italian manufacturer of hair dryers and other related hair care electrical appliances, which sells largely in the commercial side of the hair electrical appliance market, and less so the household market.

History
It was founded in 1977 by Paolo Parodi in Corsico. In 1991 it moved to Trezzano sul Naviglio. From 2000, the appliances were no longer hand-made, but made on an automated assembly line.

Structure
It is situated in the Lombardy region of Italy.

See also

 Babyliss (Conair Corporation of Connecticut)
 List of Italian companies

References

External links

 Parlux Official Site
 Wikiconic

Italian companies established in 1977
Companies based in Lombardy
Home appliance manufacturers of Italy
Italian brands
Manufacturing companies established in 1977
Personal care brands